In enzymology, a 4-cresol dehydrogenase (hydroxylating) is an enzyme that catalyzes the chemical reaction

4-cresol + acceptor + H2O  4-hydroxybenzaldehyde + reduced acceptor

The 3 substrates of this enzyme are 4-cresol, acceptor, and H2O, whereas its two products are 4-hydroxybenzaldehyde and reduced acceptor.

This enzyme belongs to the family of oxidoreductases, specifically those acting on CH or CH2 groups with other acceptors. The systematic name of this enzyme class is 4-cresol:acceptor oxidoreductase (methyl-hydroxylating). Other names in common use include p-cresol–(acceptor) oxidoreductase (hydroxylating), and ''p''-cresol methylhydroxylase. This enzyme participates in toluene and xylene degradation. It has 2 cofactors: FAD, and Cytochrome c.

Structural studies

References

 
 

EC 1.17.99
Flavoproteins
Enzymes of known structure